Mužlja is a neighborhood of the Zrenjanin city in Serbia. Formerly, it had been a separate village that joined with Zrenjanin in 1981.

Name
In Serbian the neighborhood is known as Mužlja or Мужља, in Hungarian as Muzslya or Torontálmuzslya, and in German as Muschla.

Ethnic group

Literature 
 Aranka Palatínus: A Szűzanya oltalmában. Publisher Kiss Lajos Néprajzi Tarsaság Szabadka, Muzslya, 2002.
 Miklós Karl: A dűlőutak szorgos népe, Adalékok Muzslya százéves történetéhez 1890-Published by 1990. Forum – Magyar Szó, Újvidék 1990.

External links
 

Zrenjanin